The 1970 Detroit Tigers season was a season in American baseball. The team finished fourth in the American League East with a record of 79–83, 29 games behind the Baltimore Orioles.

Offseason 
 December 13, 1969: Tom Matchick was traded by the Tigers to the Boston Red Sox for Dalton Jones.
 February 19, 1970: The Tigers' Cy Young Award winning pitcher, Denny McLain, was suspended from baseball "indefinitely" by MLB Commissioner Bowie Kuhn.
 April 1, 1970: Kuhn announced that McLain's suspension would last until July 1, 1970.  McLain missed the first 71 games of the 162-game season.

Regular season

Season standings

Record vs. opponents

Notable transactions 
 April 8, 1970: Tom Tresh was released by the Tigers.
 August 2, 1970: Kevin Collins was purchased by the Tigers from the Montreal Expos.

Roster

Player stats

Batting

Starters by position 
Note: Pos = Position; G = Games played; AB = At bats; H = Hits; Avg. = Batting average; HR = Home runs; RBI = Runs batted in

Other batters 
Note: G = Games played; AB = At bats; H = Hits; Avg. = Batting average; HR = Home runs; RBI = Runs batted in

Pitching

Starting pitchers 
Note: G = Games pitched; IP = Innings pitched; W = Wins; L = Losses; ERA = Earned run average; SO = Strikeouts

Other pitchers 
Note: G = Games pitched; IP = Innings pitched; W = Wins; L = Losses; ERA = Earned run average; SO = Strikeouts

Relief pitchers 
Note: G = Games pitched; W = Wins; L = Losses; SV = Saves; ERA = Earned run average; SO = Strikeouts

Farm system

Notes

References 

1970 Detroit Tigers season at Baseball Reference

Detroit Tigers seasons
Detroit Tigers season
Detroit Tiger
1970 in Detroit